The 1988–89 UC Irvine Anteaters men's basketball team represented the University of California, Irvine during the 1988–89 NCAA Division I men's basketball season. The Anteaters were led by ninth year head coach Bill Mulligan and played at the Bren Events Center. They were members of the Pacific Coast Athletic Association. They finished the season 12–17, 8–10 in PCAA play.

Previous season 
The 1987–88 UC Irvine Anteaters men's basketball team finished the season with a record of 16–14, 9–9 in PCAA play and reached the PCAA Tournament finals for the first time in program history. On July 1, 1988, the Pacific Coast Athletic Association officially re-branded as the Big West Conference.

Roster

Schedule

|-
!colspan=9 style=|Regular Season

|-
!colspan=9 style=| Big West Conference  tournament

Source

Awards and honors

Mike Doktorczyk
Big West Second Team All-Conference
Source:

References

UC Irvine Anteaters men's basketball seasons
UC Irvine
UC Irvine Anteaters
UC Irvine Anteaters